St. Charles Catholic High School is a private, Roman Catholic high school in Laplace, Louisiana.  It is located in the Roman Catholic Archdiocese of New Orleans.

History
In 1948, a parochial high school, St. Charles Borromeo High School, opened in Destrehan, Louisiana. The school was located on the grounds of the St. Charles Borromeo Church and was operated by the Sisters of the Congregation of the Immaculate Conception.

In 1960, the Sisters of the Most Holy Sacrament took over operation of the school and in 1978 the high school moved to LaPlace, Louisiana becoming St. Charles Catholic High School.

Athletics
St. Charles Catholic High  athletics competes in the LHSAA.

SCC participates in baseball, basketball, cross country, football, golf, powerlifting, soccer, softball, swimming, tennis, track and field, and volleyball.

State Championships
Football: 2011 (Class 3A), 2021 (Division III)
Baseball: 2019 (Division II), 2022 (Division III)
Softball: 1998 (Class 2A), 2008 (Class 3A)

Notable alumni
Tyrell Fenroy, NFL running back
Curtis Johnson, NFL coach and  head football coach at Tulane University

See also
List of schools in the Roman Catholic Archdiocese of New Orleans

References

External links
 St. Charles Catholic High School website

Catholic secondary schools in Louisiana
Catholic secondary schools in New Orleans
Schools in St. John the Baptist Parish, Louisiana
Private middle schools in Louisiana
Educational institutions established in 1978
1978 establishments in Louisiana